Mulki railway station is a station on Konkan Railway. It is at a distance of  down from origin. The preceding station on the northern direction  is Nandikoor railway station and the next station on southern direction is Surathkal railway station.

References 

Railway stations along Konkan Railway line
Railway stations in Dakshina Kannada district
Karwar railway division